Benoît Coquart is a French businessman who has been serving as CEO of Legrand since 2018.

History

Early life 
In 1994, Coquart graduated from the Paris Institute of Political Studies. Later, in 1995, he graduated from ESSEC Business School. In 1997, when Coquart was 22, he joined Legrand and managed the Group's activities in South Korea.

Legrand 
Coquart has been Director of Corporate Development and Director of Strategy and Development. Prior to that, he joined the company's Management Committee in 2010.

In 2015, he became the Director of Legrand's activities in France.

On February 8, 2018, Coquart became the Chief Executive Officer of Legrand Group, succeeding Gilles Schnepp, who held the positions of Chairman and CEO. 

In 2019, he was appointed as the President of the Jury of the Next Leaders Awards in Paris.

In the first quarter of 2021, while raw material prices increaded and the risk of shortages emerged, Benoît Coquart assured that there would be no production interruptions in any factory worldwide.

In 2021, he announced the creation of a solidarity fund that would be devoted to the staff of hospitals for geriatrics.

Other held positions 
In July 2022, he was re-elected as the President of the Alliance of electrical and digital solutions of buildings (IGNES), which brings together 60 companies in France's building sector, representing more than 2 billion euros in sales. The term of office is 3 years.

Since 2017, he has been the Vice President of the FIEEC (Federation of electrical industries, electronics and communication).

Awards 
In 2015, he was nominated in the "Smart Boss" category at the second Digital Industries Awards ceremony.

In 2019, Coquart was among the nominees in the category of "Allied Leaders" at the event of the second edition of the Ceremony of LGBT+ Role Models, organized by l'Autre Cercle association.

References 

French chief executives
Living people

Year of birth uncertain
Sciences Po alumni
ESSEC Business School alumni
1973 births
French energy industry businesspeople